The 2002 South Florida Bulls football team represented the University of South Florida (USF) in the 2002 NCAA Division I-A football season, and was the sixth team fielded by the school. The Bulls were led by head coach Jim Leavitt in his sixth year, played their home games at Raymond James Stadium in Tampa, Florida and competed as a Division I-A Independent. The Bulls finished the season with a record of nine wins and two losses (9–2). However, the Bulls did not participate in a bowl game.

Schedule

Roster

Team players in the NFL

References

South Florida
South Florida Bulls football seasons
South Florida Bulls football